10–11 The Shambles is an historic pair of buildings in the English city of York, North Yorkshire. Grade II* listed buildings, they are located in The Shambles.

The building was the 16th-century home of Margaret Clitherow, who was executed as a recusant in 1586 and canonised in 1970.

It was originally one building, it is two storeys with brick walls at the front and rear (the former rebuilt in the early 1800s. The building was divided into two tenements around 1730. They were renovated internally around sixty years later, a process that included the installation of two new staircases to the first floor.

The building was modernised in 1956, including the removal of two staircases featuring Chinese fret balustrades, but some of the original timber framing still exists. The roof at the rear is partly 15th century.

As of 2020, the buildings were occupied by The Potions Cauldron (jokingly as 9¾ Shambles, in reference to the Harry Potter series) and British Wool & Cashmere.

References

10–11
Houses in North Yorkshire
Buildings and structures in North Yorkshire
15th-century establishments in England
Grade II* listed buildings in York
Grade II* listed houses
15th century in York